

Events

Pre-1600
1174 – William I of Scotland, a key rebel in the Revolt of 1173–74, is captured at Alnwick by forces loyal to Henry II of England.
1249 – Coronation of Alexander III as King of Scots.
1260 – The Livonian Order suffers its greatest defeat in the 13th century in the Battle of Durbe against the Grand Duchy of Lithuania
1558 – Battle of Gravelines: In France, Spanish forces led by Count Lamoral of Egmont defeat the French forces of Marshal Paul de Thermes at Gravelines.
1573 – Eighty Years' War: The Siege of Haarlem ends after seven months.
1586 – Anglo–Spanish War: A convoy of English ships from the Levant Company manage to repel a fleet of eleven Spanish and Maltese galleys off the Mediterranean island of Pantelleria.

1601–1900
1643 – English Civil War: Battle of Roundway Down: In England, Henry Wilmot, 1st Earl of Rochester, commanding the Royalist forces, heavily defeats the Parliamentarian forces led by Sir William Waller.
1787 – The Congress of the Confederation enacts the Northwest Ordinance establishing governing rules for the Northwest Territory. It also establishes procedures for the admission of new states and limits the expansion of slavery.
1793 – Journalist and French revolutionary Jean-Paul Marat is assassinated in his bathtub by Charlotte Corday, a member of the opposing political faction.  
1794 – The Battle of Trippstadt between French forces and those of Prussia and Austria begins.
1814 – The Carabinieri, the national gendarmerie of Italy, is established.
1830 – The General Assembly's Institution, now the Scottish Church College, one of the pioneering institutions that ushered the Bengali Renaissance, is founded by Alexander Duff and Raja Ram Mohan Roy, in Calcutta, India.
1831 – Regulamentul Organic, a quasi-constitutional organic law is adopted in Wallachia, one of the two Danubian Principalities that were to become the basis of Romania.
1854 – In the Battle of Guaymas, Mexico, General José María Yáñez stops the French invasion led by Count Gaston de Raousset-Boulbon.
1863 – New York City draft riots: In New York City, opponents of conscription begin three days of rioting which will be later regarded as the worst in United States history.
1878 – Treaty of Berlin: The European powers redraw the map of the Balkans. Serbia, Montenegro and Romania become completely independent of the Ottoman Empire.

1901–present
1913 – The 1913 Romanian Army cholera outbreak during the Second Balkan War starts.
1919 – The British airship R34 lands in Norfolk, England, completing the first airship return journey across the Atlantic in 182 hours of flight.
1930 – The inaugural FIFA World Cup begins in Uruguay.
1941 – World War II: Montenegrins begin the Trinaestojulski ustanak (Thirteenth Uprising), a popular revolt against the Axis powers.
1956 – The Dartmouth workshop is the first conference on artificial intelligence.
1962 – In an unprecedented action, British Prime Minister Harold Macmillan dismisses seven members of his Cabinet, marking the effective end of the National Liberals as a distinct force within British politics.
1973 – Watergate scandal: Alexander Butterfield reveals the existence of a secret Oval Office taping system to investigators for the Senate Watergate Committee.
1977 – Somalia declares war on Ethiopia, starting the Ogaden War.
  1977   – New York City: Amidst a period of financial and social turmoil experiences an electrical blackout lasting nearly 24 hours that leads to widespread fires and looting.
1985 – The Live Aid benefit concert takes place in London and Philadelphia, as well as other venues such as Moscow and Sydney.
  1985   – Vice President George H. W. Bush becomes the Acting President for the day when President Ronald Reagan undergoes surgery to remove polyps from his colon.
1990 – Lenin Peak disaster: a 6.4-magnitude earthquake in Afghanistan triggers an avalanche on Lenin Peak, killing 43 climbers in the deadliest mountaineering disaster in history.
2003 – French DGSE personnel abort an operation to rescue Íngrid Betancourt from FARC rebels in Colombia, causing a political scandal when details are leaked to the press.
2008 – Battle of Wanat begins when Taliban and al-Qaeda guerrillas attack US Army and Afghan National Army troops in Afghanistan. The U.S. deaths were, at that time, the most in a single battle since the beginning of operations in 2001.
2011 – Mumbai is rocked by three bomb blasts during the evening rush hour, killing 26 and injuring 130.
  2011   – United Nations Security Council Resolution 1999 is adopted, which admits South Sudan to member status of United Nations.
2013 – Typhoon Soulik kills at least nine people and affects more than 160 million in East China and Taiwan.
2016 – Prime Minister of the United Kingdom David Cameron resigns, and is succeeded by Theresa May.
2020 – After a five-day search, the body of American actress and singer Naya Rivera is recovered from Lake Piru, where she drowned in California.

Births

Pre-1600
1470 – Francesco Armellini Pantalassi de' Medici, Catholic cardinal (d. 1528)
1478 – Giulio d'Este, illegitimate son of Italian noble (d. 1561)
1527 – John Dee, English-Welsh mathematician, astronomer, and astrologer (d. 1609)
1579 – Arthur Dee, English physician and chemist (d. 1651)
1590 – Pope Clement X (d. 1676)

1601–1900
1606 – Roland Fréart de Chambray (d. 1676)
1607 – Wenceslaus Hollar, Czech-English painter and illustrator (d. 1677)
1608 – Ferdinand III, Holy Roman Emperor (d. 1657)
1745 – Robert Calder, Scottish-English admiral (d. 1818)
1756 – Thomas Rowlandson, English artist and caricaturist (d. 1827)
1760 – István Pauli, Hungarian-Slovene priest and poet (d. 1829)
1770 – Alexander Balashov, Russian general and politician, Russian Minister of Police (d. 1837)
1793 – John Clare, English poet and author (d. 1864)
1821 – Nathan Bedford Forrest, American general and first Grand Wizard of the Ku Klux Klan (d. 1877)
1831 – Arthur Böttcher, German pathologist and anatomist (d. 1889)
1841 – Otto Wagner, Austrian architect, designed the Austrian Postal Savings Bank and Karlsplatz Stadtbahn Station (d. 1918)
1858 – Stewart Culin, American ethnographer and author (d. 1929)
1859 – Sidney Webb, 1st Baron Passfield, English economist and politician, Secretary of State for the Colonies (d. 1947)
1863 – Margaret Murray, British archaeologist, anthropologist, historian, and folklorist (d. 1963)
1864 – John Jacob Astor IV, American colonel and businessman (d. 1912)
1877 – Robert Henry Mathews, Australian linguist and missionary (d. 1970)
1884 – Yrjö Saarela, Finnish wrestler and coach (d. 1951)
1886 – Father Edward J. Flanagan, founder of Boys Town (d. 1948)
1889 – Emma Asson, Estonian educator and politician (d. 1965)
  1889   – Stan Coveleski, American baseball player (d. 1984)
1892 – Léo-Pol Morin, Canadian pianist, composer, and educator (d. 1941)
  1892   – Jonni Myyrä, Finnish-American discus and javelin thrower (d. 1955)
1894 – Isaac Babel, Russian short story writer, journalist, and playwright (d. 1940)
1895 – Sidney Blackmer, American actor (d. 1973)
1896 – Mordecai Ardon, Israeli painter and educator (d. 1992)
1898 – Julius Schreck, German commander (d. 1936)
  1898   – Ivan Triesault, Estonian-born American actor (d. 1980)
1900 – George Lewis, American clarinet player and songwriter (d. 1969)

1901–present
1901 – Eric Portman, English actor (d. 1969)
1903 – Kenneth Clark, English historian and author (d. 1983)
1905 – Alfredo M. Santos, Filipino general (d. 1990)
  1905   – Eugenio Pagnini, Italian modern pentathlete (d. 1993)
  1905   – Magda Foy, American child actress (d. 2000)
1907 – George Weller, American author, playwright, and journalist (d. 2002)
1908 – Dorothy Round, English tennis player (d. 1982)
  1908   – Tim Spencer, American country & western singer-songwriter and actor (d. 1974)
1910 – Lien Gisolf, Dutch high jumper (d. 1993)
  1910   – Loren Pope, American journalist and author (d. 2008)
1911 – Bob Steele, American radio personality (d. 2002)
1913 – Dave Garroway, American journalist and television personality (d. 1982)
  1913   – Mærsk Mc-Kinney Møller, Danish businessman (d. 2012)
1915 – Kaoru Ishikawa, Japanese author and educator (d. 1989)
1918 – Alberto Ascari, Italian race car driver (d. 1955)
  1918   – Ronald Bladen, American painter and sculptor (d. 1988)
  1918   – Marcia Brown, American author and illustrator (d. 2015)
1919 – Hau Pei-tsun, 13th Premier of the Republic of China (d. 2020)
  1919   – William F. Quinn, American lawyer (d. 2006)
1921 – Ernest Gold, Austrian-American composer and conductor (d. 1999)
1922 – Leslie Brooks, American actress (d. 2011)
  1922   – Anker Jørgensen, Danish trade union leader and politician, 16th Prime Minister of Denmark (d. 2016)
  1922   – Helmy Afify Abd El-Bar, Egyptian military commander (d. 2011)
  1922   – Ken Mosdell, Canadian ice hockey player (d. 2006)
1923 – Ashley Bryan, American children's book author and illustrator (d. 2022)
1924 – Johnny Gilbert, American game show host and announcer
1925 – Suzanne Zimmerman, American competition swimmer and Olympic medalist (d. 2021)
  1925   – Huang Zongying, Chinese actress and writer (d. 2020)
1926 – Robert H. Justman, American director, producer, and production manager (d. 2008)
  1926   – T. Loren Christianson, American politician (d. 2019)
  1926   – Thomas Clark, American politician (d. 2020)
1927 – Simone Veil, French lawyer and politician, President of the European Parliament (d. 2017)
  1927   – Ian Reed, Australian discus thrower (d. 2020)
1928 – Bob Crane, American actor (d. 1978)
  1928   – Sven Davidson, Swedish-American tennis player (d. 2008)
  1928   – Al Rex, American musician (d. 2020)
1929 – Sofia Muratova, Russian gymnast (d. 2006)
  1929   – Svein Ellingsen, Norwegian visual artist and hymnist (d. 2020)
1930 – Sam Greenlee, American author and poet (d. 2014)
  1930   – Naomi Shemer, Israeli singer-songwriter (d. 2004)
1931 – Frank Ramsey, American basketball player and coach (d. 2018)
1932 – Hubert Reeves, Canadian-French astrophysicist and author
1933 – David Storey, English author, playwright, and screenwriter (d. 2017)
  1933   – Piero Manzoni, Italian artist (d. 1963)
1934 – Peter Gzowski, Canadian journalist and academic (d. 2002)
  1934   – Gordon Lee, English footballer and manager (d. 2022)
  1934   – Wole Soyinka, Nigerian author, poet, and playwright, Nobel Prize laureate
  1934   – Aleksei Yeliseyev, Russian engineer and astronaut
1935 – Jack Kemp, American football player and politician, 9th United States Secretary of Housing and Urban Development (d. 2009)
  1935   – Earl Lovelace, Trinidadian journalist, author, and playwright
  1935   – Kurt Westergaard, Danish cartoonist (d. 2021)
1936 – Albert Ayler, American saxophonist and composer (d. 1970)
1937 – Ghillean Prance, English botanist and ecologist
1939 – Lambert Jackson Woodburne, South African admiral (d. 2013)
1940 – Tom Lichtenberg, American football player and coach (d. 2013)
  1940   – Paul Prudhomme, American chef and author (d. 2015)
  1940   – Patrick Stewart, English actor, director, and producer
1941 – Grahame Corling, Australian cricketer 
  1941   – Robert Forster, American actor and producer (d. 2019)
  1941   – Ehud Manor, Israeli songwriter and translator (d. 2005)
  1941   – Jacques Perrin, French actor, director, and producer (d. 2022)
1942 – Harrison Ford, American actor and producer
  1942   – Roger McGuinn, American singer-songwriter and guitarist 
1943 – Chris Serle, English journalist and actor
1944 – Eric Freeman, Australian cricketer 
  1944   – Cyril Knowles, English footballer and manager (d. 1991)
  1944   – Ernő Rubik, Hungarian game designer, architect, and educator, invented the Rubik's Cube
1945 – Ashley Mallett, Australian cricketer and author (d. 2021)
1946 – Bob Kauffman, American basketball player and coach (d. 2015)
  1946   – Cheech Marin, American actor and comedian
1948 – Tony Kornheiser,  American television sports talk show host and former sportswriter
  1948 – Catherine Breillat, French director and screenwriter
1949 – Bryan Murray, Irish actor
1950 – George Nelson, American astronomer and astronaut
  1950   – Ma Ying-jeou, Hong Kong-Taiwanese commander and politician, 12th President of the Republic of China
  1950   – Jurelang Zedkaia, Marshallese politician, 5th President of the Marshall Islands (d. 2015)
1951 – Rob Bishop, American educator and politician
  1951   – Didi Conn, American actress and singer
1953 – Gil Birmingham, American actor
  1953   – David Thompson, American basketball player
1954 – Ray Bright, Australian cricketer 
  1954   – Louise Mandrell, American singer-songwriter and actress
1956 – Mark Mendoza, American bass player and songwriter 
1956 – Michael Spinks, American boxer
1957 – Thierry Boutsen, Belgian race car driver and businessman
  1957   – Cameron Crowe, American director, producer, and screenwriter
1959 – Richard Leman, English field hockey player
  1959   – Fuziah Salleh, Malaysian politician
1960 – Robert Abraham, American football player
  1960   – Ian Hislop, Welsh-English journalist and screenwriter
  1960   – Curtis Rouse, American football player (d. 2013)
1961 – Tahira Asif, Pakistani politician (d. 2014)
  1961   – Anders Jarryd, Swedish tennis player 
  1961   – Khalid Mahmood, Pakistani-English engineer and politician
  1961   – Stelios Manolas, Greek footballer and manager
  1961   – Tim Watson, Australian footballer, coach, and journalist
1962 – Tom Kenny, American voice actor and screenwriter
  1962   – Rhonda Vincent, American singer-songwriter and mandolin player
1963 – Neal Foulds, English snooker player and sportscaster
  1963   – Kenny Johnson, American actor, producer, and model
1964 – Charlie Hides, American drag queen and comedian
  1964   – Paul Thorn, American singer-songwriter and guitarist
1965 – Eileen Ivers, American fiddler 
  1965   – Colin van der Voort, Australian rugby league player 
1966 – Gerald Levert, American R&B singer-songwriter, producer, and actor (d. 2006)
  1966   – Natalia Luis-Bassa, Venezuelan-English conductor and educator
1967 – Richard Marles, Australian lawyer and politician, 50th Australian Minister for Trade and Investment
  1967   – Mark McGowan, Australian politician, 30th Premier of Western Australia
1969 – Brad Godden, Australian rugby league player
  1969   – Ken Jeong, American actor, comedian, and physician
  1969   – Oleg Serebrian, Moldovan political scientist and politician 
1970 – Andrei Tivontchik, German pole vaulter and trainer
1971 – Mark Neeld, Australian footballer and coach
1972 – Sean Waltman, American professional wrestler
1974 – Deborah Cox, Canadian singer-songwriter and actress
  1974   – Jarno Trulli, Italian race car driver
1975 – Diego Spotorno, Ecuadorian actor
  1975   – Mariada Pieridi, Cypriot singer-songwriter
1976 – Sheldon Souray, Canadian ice hockey player
1977 – Chris Horn, American football player
1978 – Ryan Ludwick, American baseball player
  1978   – Prodromos Nikolaidis, Greek basketball player
1979 – Craig Bellamy, Welsh footballer
  1979   – Daniel Díaz, Argentinian footballer
  1979   – Libuše Průšová, Czech tennis player
  1979   – Lucinda Ruh, Swiss figure skater and coach
1981 – Ágnes Kovács, Hungarian swimmer
  1981   – Mirco Lorenzetto, Italian cyclist
1982 – Shin-Soo Choo, South Korean baseball player
  1982   – Simon Clist, English footballer
  1982   – Dominic Isaacs, South African footballer
  1982   – Nick Kenny, Australian rugby league player
  1982   – Yadier Molina, Puerto Rican-American baseball player
1983 – Kristof Beyens, Belgian sprinter
  1983   – Marco Pomante, Italian footballer
  1983   – Liu Xiang, Chinese hurdler
1984 – Ida Maria, Norwegian singer-songwriter and guitarist
  1984 – Faf du Plessis, South African professional cricketer
1985 – Trell Kimmons, American sprinter
  1985   – Guillermo Ochoa, Mexican footballer
  1985   – Charlotte Dujardin, English equestrian
1988 – Marcos Paulo Gelmini Gomes, Brazilian-Italian footballer
  1988   – Colton Haynes, American actor, model and singer
  1988   – Steven R. McQueen, American actor and model
  1988   – Raúl Spank, German high jumper
  1988   – Tulisa, English singer-songwriter and actress 
1989 – Leon Bridges, American soul singer, songwriter and record producer
  1989   – Charis Giannopoulos, Greek basketball player
1990 – Kieran Foran, New Zealand rugby league player
  1990   – Eduardo Salvio, Argentinian footballer
1992 – Elise Matthysen, Belgian swimmer
1993 – Daniel Bentley, English footballer
1995 – Cody Bellinger, American baseball player
  1995   – Dante Exum, Australian basketball player
2002 – Deborah Medrado, Brazilian rhythmic gymnast
2003 – Mason Teague, Australian rugby league player

Deaths

Pre-1600
 574 – John III, pope of the Catholic Church
 716 – Rui Zong, Chinese emperor (b. 662)
 815 – Wu Yuanheng, Chinese poet and politician (b. 758)
858 – Æthelwulf, King of Wessex
 884 – Huang Chao, Chinese rebel leader (b. 835)
 939 – Leo VII, pope of the Catholic Church 
 982 – Gunther, margrave of Merseburg
   982   – Henry I, bishop of Augsburg
   982   – Pandulf II, Lombard prince
   982   – Landulf IV, Lombard prince
   982   – Abu'l-Qasim, Kalbid emir of Sicily
1024 – Henry II, Holy Roman Emperor (b. 973)
1105 – Rashi, French rabbi and commentator (b. 1040)
1205 – Hubert Walter, English archbishop and politician, Lord Chancellor of The United Kingdom (b. 1160)
1357 – Bartolus de Saxoferrato Italian academic and jurist (b. 1313)
1380 – Bertrand du Guesclin, French nobleman and knight (b. 1320)
1399 – Peter Parler, German architect, designed St. Vitus Cathedral and Charles Bridge (b. 1330)
1491 – Afonso, Portuguese prince (b. 1475)
1551 – John Wallop, English soldier and diplomat (b. 1490)

1601–1900
1617 – Adam Wenceslaus, duke of Cieszyn (b. 1574)
1621 – Albert VII, archduke of Austria (b. 1559)
1626 – Robert Sidney, 1st Earl of Leicester, English politician (b. 1563)
1628 – Robert Shirley, English soldier and diplomat (b. 1581)
1629 – Caspar Bartholin the Elder, Swedish physician and theologian (b. 1585)
1683 – Arthur Capell, 1st Earl of Essex, English politician, Lord Lieutenant of Ireland (b. 1631)
1755 – Edward Braddock, Scottish general (b. 1695)
1762 – James Bradley, English priest and astronomer (b. 1693)
1789 – Victor de Riqueti, marquis de Mirabeau, French economist and academic (b. 1715)
1793 – Jean-Paul Marat, Swiss-French physician, scientist and theorist (b. 1743)
1807 – Henry Benedict Stuart, Italian cardinal, pretender to the British throne and last member of the House of Stuart  (b. 1725)
1881 – John C. Pemberton, American general (b. 1814)
1889 – Robert Hamerling, Austrian author, poet, and playwright (b. 1830)
1890 – John C. Frémont, American general and politician, 5th Territorial Governor of Arizona (b. 1813)
  1890   – Johann Voldemar Jannsen, Estonian journalist and poet (b. 1819)
1893 – Young Man Afraid of His Horses, American tribal chief (b. 1836)
1896 – August Kekulé, German chemist and academic (b. 1829)

1901–present
1907 – Henrik Sillem, Dutch target shooter and jurist (b. 1866)
1911 – Allan McLean, Scottish-Australian politician, 19th Premier of Victoria (b. 1840)
1921 – Gabriel Lippmann, Luxembourger physicist and academic, Nobel Prize laureate (b. 1845)
1922 – Martin Dies Sr., American journalist and politician (b. 1870)
1927 – Mimar Kemaleddin Bey, Turkish architect and academic, designed the Tayyare Apartments (b. 1870)
1934 – Mary E. Byrd, American astronomer and academic (b. 1849)
1936 – Kojo Tovalou Houénou, Beninese lawyer and politician (b. 1887)
1941 – Ilmar Raud, Estonian chess player (b. 1913)
1945 – Alla Nazimova, Russian-American actress, producer, and screenwriter (b. 1879)
1946 – Alfred Stieglitz, American photographer and curator (b. 1864)
1949 – Walt Kuhn, American painter and academic (b. 1877)
1951 – Arnold Schoenberg, Austrian-American composer and painter (b. 1874)
1954 – Frida Kahlo, Mexican painter and educator (b. 1907)
1960 – Joy Davidman, American-English poet and author (b. 1915)
1965 – Photis Kontoglou, Greek painter and illustrator (b. 1895)
1967 – Tom Simpson, English cyclist (b. 1937)
1970 – Leslie Groves, American general and engineer (b. 1896)
  1970   – Sheng Shicai, Chinese warlord (b. 1895)
1973 – Willy Fritsch, German actor and screenwriter (b. 1901)
1974 – Patrick Blackett, Baron Blackett, English physicist and academic, Nobel Prize laureate (b. 1897)
1976 – Frederick Hawksworth, English engineer (b. 1884)
  1976   – Joachim Peiper, German SS officer (b. 1915)
1979 – Ludwig Merwart, Austrian painter and illustrator (b. 1913)
1980 – Seretse Khama, Botswana lawyer and politician, 1st President of Botswana (b. 1921)
  1981   – Martin Hurson Irish Republican Hunger Striker
1983 – Gabrielle Roy, Canadian engineer and author (b. 1909)
1993 – Davey Allison, American race car driver (b. 1961)
1995 – Godtfred Kirk Christiansen, Danish businessman (b. 1920)
1996 – Pandro S. Berman, American director, producer, and production manager (b. 1905)
1997 – Miguel Ángel Blanco, Spanish politician (b. 1968)
1999 – Konstantinos Kollias, Greek general and politician, 168th Prime Minister of Greece (b. 1901)
2000 – Jan Karski, Polish-American activist and academic (b. 1914)
2003 – Compay Segundo, Cuban singer-songwriter and guitarist (b. 1907)
2005 – Robert E. Ogren, American zoologist (b. 1922)
2006 – Red Buttons, American actor (b. 1919)
2007 – Michael Reardon, American mountaineer (b. 1965)
2008 – Bronisław Geremek, Polish historian and politician, Polish Minister of Foreign Affairs (b. 1932)
2010 – Manohari Singh, Indian saxophonist and composer (b. 1931)
  2010   – George Steinbrenner, American businessman (b. 1930)
2011 – Allan Jeans, Australian footballer and coach (b. 1933)
2012 – Warren Jabali, American basketball player (b. 1946)
  2012   – Jerzy Kulej, Polish boxer and politician (b. 1940)
  2012   – Richard D. Zanuck, American film producer (b. 1934)
2013 – Leonard Garment,  American lawyer and public servant, 14th White House Counsel (b. 1924)
  2013   – Henri Julien, French race car driver (b. 1927)
  2013   – Cory Monteith, Canadian actor and singer (b. 1982)
  2013   – Ottavio Quattrocchi, Italian businessman (b. 1938)
  2013   – Vernon B. Romney, American lawyer and politician, 14th Attorney General of Utah (b. 1924)
  2013   – Marc Simont, French-American author and illustrator (b. 1915)
2014 – Thomas Berger, American author and playwright (b. 1924)
  2014   – Alfred de Grazia, American political scientist, author, and academic (b. 1919)
  2014   – Nadine Gordimer, South African novelist, short story writer, and activist, Nobel Prize laureate (b. 1923)
  2014   – Jeff Leiding, American football player (b. 1961)
  2014   – Lorin Maazel, French-American violinist, composer, and conductor (b. 1930)
2015 – Philipp Mißfelder, German historian and politician (b. 1979)
  2015   – Martin Litchfield West, English scholar, author, and academic (b. 1927)
2017 – Liu Xiaobo, Chinese literary critic, human rights activist (b. 1955)
2020 – Grant Imahara, American electrical engineer, roboticist, and television host (b. 1970)
  2020   – Zindzi Mandela, South African politician, diplomat, and third daughter of Nelson Mandela (b. 1960).

Holidays and observances
Christian feast day:
Abd-al-Masih
Abel of Tacla Haimonot (Coptic Church)
Clelia Barbieri
Conrad Weiser (Episcopal Church (USA))
Eugenius of Carthage
Henry II, Holy Roman Emperor
Mildrith of Thanet
Silas (Catholic Church)
Teresa of the Andes
July 13 (Eastern Orthodox liturgics)
Feast of Kalimát, first day of the seventh month of the Baháʼí calendar. (Baháʼí Faith)
Statehood Day (Montenegro)
The last day of Naadam (Mongolia)
Kashmir Martyrs' Day (Pakistan)

References

External links

 
 
 

Days of the year
July